Cochrane Aerodrome  is a registered aerodrome located  north of Cochrane, Ontario, Canada.

Facilities
Cochrane Airport has a single asphalt paved runway designated 13/31 which measures .

See also
Cochrane Water Aerodrome

References

External links
Page about this airport on COPA's Places to Fly airport directory

Registered aerodromes in Cochrane District
Transport in Cochrane, Ontario